Cathartosilvanus is a genus of beetles in the family Silvanidae, containing the following species:

 Cathartosilvanus aitkenae Halstead
 Cathartosilvanus imbellis LeConte
 Cathartosilvanus opaculus LeConte
 Cathartosilvanus tropicalis Van Dyke
 Cathartosilvanus vulgaris Grouvelle

References

Silvanidae genera